Puttur may refer to:

 Puttur, Karnataka, a city in South Kannada district, Karnataka, India
 Puttur (Vidhana Sabha constituency), Assembly constituency of Puttur, Karnataka
 Puttur, Andhra Pradesh, a town in Andhra Pradesh state in India
Puttur (Andhra Pradesh Assembly constituency), a defunct Assembly constituency of Puttur, Andhra Pradesh
Puttur mandal, a mandal in Andhra Pradesh
 Puttur, Sri Lanka, a town in Sri Lanka
 Puttur Narasimha Nayak, Kannada and Konkani singer

See also
Puthur (disambiguation)
Pudur (disambiguation)